The Selwyn G. Blaylock Medal or Selwyn Blaylock Canadian Mining Excellence Award was established in 1948 and is awarded annually by the Canadian Institute of Mining, Metallurgy and Petroleum to an individual that has demonstrated distinguished service to Canada through exceptional achievement in the field of mining, metallurgy, or geology.

The medal honours Selwyn G. Blaylock, one of the pioneers in the mining industry in western Canada. He was president of Cominco, recipient of several international awards for his work in metallurgy, and was the President of the Institute in 1934-35.

Past Recipients
Source: Selwyn Blaylock Award Past Winners

See also

 List of geology awards

References

External links
Selwyn G. Blaylock Medal
Selwyn G. Blaylock Medal Winners

Canadian science and technology awards
Geology awards
Canadian Institute of Mining, Metallurgy and Petroleum